The explosion of animals is an uncommon event arising through natural causes or human activity. Among the best known examples are the post-mortem explosion of whales, either as a result of natural decomposition or deliberate attempts at carcass disposal. Other instances of exploding animals are defensive in nature or the result of human intervention.

Causes of explosions

Natural explosions can occur for a variety of reasons. Post-mortem explosions, like that of a beached whale, are the result of the build-up of natural gases created by methane-producing bacteria inside the carcass during the decomposition process. Natural explosions which occur while an animal is living may be defense-related.  A number of toads in Germany and Denmark exploded in April 2005. The Los Angeles Herald in 1910 reported a duck which exploded after consuming yeast.

Weaponization
Various military attempts have been made to use animals as delivery systems for weapons. In Song Dynasty China, oxen carrying large explosive charges were used as self-propelled explosive missiles.  During World War II the United States investigated the use of "bat bombs", or bats carrying small incendiary bombs, while at the same time the Soviet Union developed the "anti-tank dog" for use against German tanks.  Other attempts have included the so-called "kamikaze dolphins", intended to seek out and destroy submarines and enemy warships. There have also been a number of documented incidents of animal-borne bomb attacks, in which donkeys, mules or horses were used to deliver bombs.

Examples

Ants

Some insects explode altruistically, at the expense of the individual in defense of its colony; the process is called autothysis. Several species of ants, such as Camponotus saundersi in southeast Asia, can explode at will to protect their nests from intruders. C. saundersi, a species of carpenter ant, can self-destruct by autothysis. Two oversized, poison-filled mandibular glands run the entire length of the ant's body. When combat takes a turn for the worse, the ant violently contracts its abdominal muscles to rupture its body and spray poison in all directions. Likewise, many species of termites, such as Globitermes sulphureus, have members, deemed the soldier class, who can split their bodies open emitting a noxious and sticky chemical for the same reason.

Cows
In January 1932, the Townsville Daily Bulletin, an Australian newspaper, reported an incident where a dairy cow was partially blown up and killed on a farm at Kennedy Creek (near Cardwell, North Queensland). The cow had reputedly picked up a detonator in her mouth while grazing in a paddock. This was only triggered later, when the cow began to chew her cud, at a time when she was in the process of being milked. The cow had its head blown off by the resulting explosion, and the farmer milking the cow was knocked unconscious.

Rats 
The explosive rat, also known as a rat bomb, was a weapon developed by the British Special Operations Executive (SOE) in World War II for use against Germany. Rat carcasses were filled with plastic explosives, and were to be distributed near German boiler rooms, where it was expected they would be disposed of by burning, with the subsequent explosion having a chance of causing a boiler explosion. The explosive rats never saw use, as the first shipment was intercepted by the Germans; however, the resulting search for more booby trapped rats consumed enough German resources for the SOE to conclude that the operation was a success.

Toads

According to worldwide media reports in April 2005, toads in the Altona district of Hamburg were observed by nature protection officials to swell up with gases and explode, propelling their innards for distances of up to one meter. These incidents prompted local residents to refer to the area's lake—home to the toads—. The incidents were reported as occurring with greatest frequency between 2 and 3 a.m. Werner Smolnik, environmental movement worker, stated on April 26, 2005, at least 1,000 toads had died in this manner over a series of a few days. According to German conservationist Werner Smolnik, the toads expanded to three and a half times their normal size before blowing up, and were noted to live a short time after exploding.

Berlin veterinarian Franz Mutschmann collected toad corpses and performed necropsies. He theorized that the phenomenon was linked to a recent influx of predatory crows to the area. He stated that the cause was a mixture of crow attacks and the natural puff up defense of the toads. Crows attacked the toads in order to pick through the skin between the amphibians' chests and abdominal cavities, picking out the toads' livers, which appear to be a delicacy for crows in the area. In a defensive move, the toads begin to blow themselves up, which in turn, due to the hole in the toad's body and the missing liver, led to a rupture of blood vessels and lungs, and to the spreading of intestines. The apparent epidemic nature of the phenomenon was also explained by Mutschmann: "Crows are intelligent animals. They learn very quickly how to eat the toads' livers."

Initial theories had included a viral or fungal infection, possibly one also affecting foreign horses involved in horse racing at a nearby track. However, laboratory tests were unable to detect an infectious agent.

See also 

 Animal-borne bomb attacks
 Autothysis
 Blast fishing
 Decline in amphibian populations
 Military animals as living bombs
 Raining animals
 Self-destruct
 Spontaneous human combustion

References

Predation
Cruelty to animals